The Sinister Syndicate is a group of supervillains appearing in American comic books published by Marvel Comics. The characters serve as a collection of lesser-known Spider-Man villains. The group was the focus of the 1991 Deadly Foes of Spider-Man mini-series.

Publication history
The Sinister Syndicate first appeared in The Amazing Spider-Man #280 and was created by Tom DeFalco and Ron Frenz.

Fictional team history

First version
Patterned after the conglomeration of Spider-Man's deadliest foes who call themselves the Sinister Six, the Sinister Syndicate originally was formed by the super-villain Beetle. The original roster of the group consisted of Beetle, Hydro-Man, Rhino, Boomerang, and Speed Demon, who collectively gathered together under the Beetle's leadership. Unlike the Sinister Six, which was formed mainly to destroy Spider-Man, the Syndicate was formed to act as a mercenary group that worked for the highest bidder. The Sinister Syndicate first mission has them successfully preventing Spider-Man and Silver Sable from capturing famed assassin Jason Macendale, then known as Jack O'Lantern. Despite some difficulty, Spider-Man and Silver Sable were able to repel them with the help of Sandman.

Second version
The group, now featuring getaway driver/Boomerang's girlfriend Leila Davis, were the focus of the 1991 mini-series Deadly Foes of Spider-Man. The four-issue mini-series focused upon the group's break-up due to the Beetle's jealousy towards Boomerang and his attempts to usurp control over the group. Beetle eventually betrayed Boomerang by allowing him to be caught during a robbery and then convincing him to use Beetle's lawyer Steve Partridge, not knowing that Beetle had instructed his lawyer to throw the trial to ensure Boomerang's conviction.

Speed Demon begins a relationship with Leila. The Sinister Syndicate crashes the trial of Boomerang where Partridge brought up people to talk about Boomerang leading him to think that Patrtrige sold him out. Spider-Man helped to fight the Sinister Syndicate who got away. Leila anticipated that Kingpin would bribe Partridge to flub the case.

As Beetle keeps his trap for Spider-Man that involves the District Attorney being strapped to a bomb private, he claims that he has an inside person who can get Boomerang out of prison. As Rhino leaves upon not wanting any more involvement in the caper, Leila hears Beetle talking to Partridge about a plan to get Boomerang out that involves Kingpin. Shocker helps Boomerang escape jail. Leila betrays Speed Demon and reveals her true purpose for dating Boomerang and involving herself with the Syndicate: Leila was the widow of the super-villain Ringer. The Ringer had been kidnapped years earlier by Beetle, who then strapped a (what was ultimately revealed to be fake) bomb to his chest, forcing him to fight Spider-Man. Beetle watched via a camera hidden inside "the bomb" in order for him to observe Spider-Man in action. When Spider-Man defeated the Ringer and exposed Beetle's scheme, Ringer was humiliated and branded a loser by his fellow villains, culminating in his being killed by the Scourge. Leila sought to destroy Beetle in order to avenge her husband. As Beetle forges an alliance with Kingpin, Rhino locates a scientist named Dr. Goulding who can remove his rhino-themed body-armor, which had been permanently bonded to his body at the time. The scientist however, owes the Kingpin a large sum of money in unpaid gambling debts, resulting in Beetle killing the scientist. Rhino thought that his former teammates killed Dr. Goulding to get him back on the team causing the Sinister Syndicate to flee where they didn't want to fight Rhino.

In the end, a massive showdown ensued between the members where Beetle has Hydro-Man and Speed Demon on his side while Leila has Boomerang and Rhino on her side. When Beetle throws a car at Leila, she is saved by Spider-Man who prevents her from shooting Beetle. This causes Leila to don Ringer's gloves to trap Beetle as the police arrive. Leila escapes with Boomerang and Rhino, while Beetle went to jail and Speed Demon and Hydro-Man made their own escapes. The in-fighting of the Sinister Syndicate served as distraction for Kingpin to get the data that he needs while also paying Rhino the money enough to get the Rhino armor removed.

Although not referring to themselves as the Sinister Syndicate, Beetle, Boomerang, Hydro-Man, Rhino, and Speed Demon are among the villains hired by Justin Hammer to protect his secret laboratory from Spider-Man and the New Warriors. During the villains' fight with the New Warriors, they flee when Spider-Man arrives where they seal the door behind them.

Third version
As Hardshell, Leila Davis assembles Boomerang, Rhino, and Vulture for her version of the Sinister Syndicate. When it comes to motives, Rhino wants to bring his family to North America, Boomerang wants money and revenge on Beetle, and Vulture is seeking a cure for cancer. They agree to her offer for now. They attack the Atomic Research Company in Yonkers, New York where they want Doctor Octopus' cousin Elias Hargrove to tell them where the Nuclear Blaster. They get the location as Hargrove uses a plexiglass shield to protect himself and Spider-Man from nuclear blasts. When the Sinister Syndicate arrives in Central Park, the Sinister Syndicate accidentally set off the weapon that enables a nearby and homeless Vincent Stegron to become Stegron the Dinosaur Man again. Vulture was planning to use the Nuclear Blaster to cure himself of cancer while Boomerang and Rhino want to sell the weapon to A.I.M. Before they can make their decisions, Beetle and Stegron raid their hideout where they have Spider-Man as their prisoner. They want to trade Spider-Man for the Nuclear Blaster. Hardshell does not want the Nuclear Blasters given to Beetle and Stegron. This results in a two-way battle as Hardshell is observed by someone named Strikeback. Beetle and Stegron make off with the Nuclear Blaster. Their fight brings them and Strikeback into Doctor Octopus' lab as Spider-Man joins the battle. While the feedback of the Nuclear Blaster knocks out Spider-Man and Doctor Octopus, Swarm joins the battle wanting to destroy the villains' mutual enemy Spider-Man. As the two-way battle between the Sinister Syndicate and Beetle and Stegron continues, Leila learns that Strikeback is actually Ringer who was reanimated as a cyborg by A.I.M. as Swarm tries to destroy Spider-Man. The battle ends with Beetle, Rhino, and Vulture being incapacitated alongside Beetle and Stegron.

Unofficial versions

In Avengers: The Initiative, half of the Syndicate (Hydro-Man, Shocker, and Boomerang) reunite and fight Spider-Man. The battle is interrupted by Komodo and War Machine. They are later apprehended by the Initiative's Scarlet Spiders.

Some members of the Sinister Syndicate are reunited in the 2013 ongoing series Superior Foes of Spider-Man. Boomerang is the leader of the new "Sinister Six", which includes Shocker, Overdrive, Speed Demon and a new female Beetle. As the Beetle points out, the new group only has five members due to the Superior Spider (Doctor Octopus' mind in Peter Parker's body) reprogramming Living Brain to serve him, but Boomerang insists on keeping the "Sinister Six" name. Shocker suggests going back to the name "Sinister Syndicate", but the idea is quickly squelched, with Speed Demon objecting, "The Sinister Syndicate were losers!"

Fourth version
Operatives of Mayor Wilson Fisk free Electro (Francine Frye) so that she can be part of a female version of the Sinister Syndicate.

While waiting in another room, Electro meets with Beetle who states that she is offering her membership. While Francine mentioned how she got her powers by kissing Electro, Janice mentions that she is Tombstone's daughter. Janice states that they are building an organization that values and respects the female contributions to the side of evil. Outside of the mentor-ship programs, salons, and a child care facility, Janice states that they had a teleconference Black Mariah from prison and are trying to make contact with Morgan le Fay. Janice then proceeds to introduce Francine to the rest of the team consisting of Lady Octopus, Scorpia, Trapstr, and White Rabbit. After meeting its members, Electro was reluctant to join with them until she hears from Janice that their first mission given to them by Mayor Wilson Fisk to target Boomerang. This is enough to convince Electro to join as she asks them to put her down for two vegan cheeseburgers. The Sinister Syndicate begins their mission where they attack the F.E.A.S.T. building that Boomerang is volunteering at.

Boomerang tries to reason with Beetle and Electro who are still made at him for betraying him. Beetle states that they aren't targeting F.E.A.S.T., they are targeting him. Beetle leads the Sinister Syndicate in attacking Boomerang. It was stated by Boomerang that he was the one who came up with the Sinister Syndicate name. Lady Octopus stated that they dropped the "Sinister" part of the Sinister Syndicate's name. After getting Aunt May to safety, Peter Parker changes into Spider-Man and helps Boomerang fight the Syndicate. The Syndicate starts doing their formation attack until Spider-Man accidentally sets off Boomerang's gaserang which knocks out Spider-Man enough for the Syndicate to make off with Boomerang. As Beetle has Electro write a proposal on how the Syndicate can use Boomerang as an example to the criminal underworld, Beetle leave while calling Wilson Fisk that they caught Boomerang as she is given the information on where the exchange can happen.

After some time with Randy Robertson, Beetle sends Mayor Wilson Fisk the coordinates to Boomerang's location and goes to meet up with the Syndicate. As they plan to adjourn for the night, they hear Mayor Fisk outside stating that they are harboring a criminal and are to surrender Boomerang to him or suffer the full might of New York City. The Syndicate notices the police, the SWAT Team, the Anti-Super Squad, and low-level bureaucrats. Spider-Man arrives as well and tries to get Mayor Fisk to have the authorities stand down only for Mayor Fisk to claim that Spider-Man fell prey to Boomerang's hypnotic boomerang. Electro claims that Spider-Man is buying them some time. After reading the paper in Boomerang's hand that belonged to Mayor Fisk, Beetle tells the Syndicate that they should let Boomerang go. While Beetle claimed that she betrayed them, she did it because she's a supervillain and states that she plans to have Mayor Fisk deputize them. The rest of the Syndicate is not up with this plan. The Syndicate then assists Spider-Man against Mayor Fisk's forces. Beetle has Spider-Man evacuate Boomerang while the Syndicate fights Mayor Fisk's forces while not killing them. The Syndicate is defeated and arrested by the police. Their transport is then attacked by an unknown assailant who frees them.

During the "Sinister War" storyline, the Sinister Syndicate is discussing adding Ana Kravinoff to their ranks. Scorpia objects to this as Beetle states to her that they are not the Sinister Six. The group and Ana are then abducted by Kindred's giant centipedes where Kindred offers them and the other villains the opportunity to take down Spider-Man and punish him for his sins. With Ana officially their latest member, the Sinister Syndicate intercept Overdrive who was carrying Spider-Man away from Foreigner's group.

Membership
The following is the known membership of the Sinister Syndicate:

First Sinister Syndicate
 Beetle (leader)
 Boomerang
 Hydro-Man
 Rhino
 Speed Demon

Second Sinister Syndicate
 Beetle (leader)
 Boomerang
 Hydro-Man
 Rhino
 Speed Demon
 Hardshell (driver)
 Shocker

Third Sinister Syndicate
 Leila Davis (leader)
 Boomerang
 Rhino
 Vulture

Fourth Sinister Syndicate
 Beetle (leader)
 Electro II
 Kraven the Hunter III
 Lady Octopus
 Scorpia
 Trapstr
 White Rabbit

Other uses
 The Life Foundation formed a group with the same name with the five symbiotes seeds probed from Venom named Scream, Phage, Lasher, Riot and Agony.
 Sinister Syndicate is also the generic name of affiliation in the Marvel VS System card game for Spider-Man's various villains, as well as many of Spider-Man's major foes in the Marvel HeroClix game.

In other media
 The Sinister Syndicate appears in Marvel Super Hero Squad Online, consisting of Doctor Octopus, the Green Goblin, the Lizard, Mysterio, and Venom.
 The Sinister Syndicate appears in The Amazing Adventures of Spider-Man, consisting of Doctor Octopus, Electro, Scream, Hydro-Man, and the Hobgoblin.

References

External links
 Sinister Syndicate at Marvel.com
 Sinister Syndicate at Marvel Wiki

Comics characters introduced in 1986
Marvel Comics supervillain teams